Yagua is a  Venezuelan town located to the Northwest of the Valencia Lake, in the Guacara Municipality in the
Carabobo State. The area corresponds to the rural parish of the same name.

In the area of Tronconero, Vigirima, there are petroglyphs made by pre-Colonial Indians.

History 

The entire area became inhabited thousands of year ago by the Indians of the Tacarigua Lake (Valencia Lake).
The town of Yagua was founded on 20 February 1694, at the same time as the city of Guacara. 
Until 1935 a large part of the area was property of Pimentel, a friend of dictator Juan Vicente Gómez.

Yagua became a rural parish on 27 June 1988.

Population 

There are some 18,000 people living in the area.

Población de Parroquias de Carabobo

Infrastructure 

The second most important oil distribution centre of Venezuela is located in the outskirts of the town proper.

Yagua has an important sport centre for the area, the Centro Deportivo Yagua.

Populated places in Carabobo
Populated places established in 1694
1694 establishments in the Spanish Empire